Arthur Young (1816 – 27 March 1906) was an Australian politician.

Young was born in Aberdeenshire in 1816. In 1886 he was elected to the Tasmanian House of Assembly, representing the seat of East Devon. He served until 1891. He died in 1906 in Devonport.

References

1816 births
1906 deaths
Members of the Tasmanian House of Assembly